Route 10, also known as the eastern portion of the Irish Loop Drive and the Southern Shore Highway, is a  uncontrolled-access highway in Newfoundland and Labrador. Its southern terminus is at Route 90 in St. Vincent's-St. Stephen's-Peter's River, and its northern terminus is at Route 2 and The Parkway in St. John's. The route is in Division No. 1 and winds along the southern and eastern coasts of Avalon Peninsula on the island of Newfoundland.

Route description

Route 10 begins in St. Vincent's-St. Stephen's-Peter's River at a bridge along the beach, which straddles a narrow isthmus between the ocean and a large lagoon (Holyrood Pond), with the road continuing west as Route 90. It continues south along the coast to cross over the Peter's River before leaving the town and winding its way east through hilly and rural grassland. The highway then has an intersection with St. Shott's Road, the only road access to the town of St. Shott's and Cape Pine, before passing through the towns of Trepassey, Biscay Bay, and Portugal Cove South. Route 10 passes just north of Chance Cove Provincial Park before turning north to wind along the coastline again to pass through Renews-Cappahayden, Fermeuse (where it has an intersection with Port Kirwan Road, which provides access to Port Kirwan), Aquaforte, Ferryland, Calvert, and Cape Broyle. It then passes through La Manche Provincial Park before passing through Tors Cove, Mobile, and Witless Bay, where it has an intersection with Route 13. The highway passes through Bay Bulls before leaving the coastline and passing through rural areas for several kilometres. Route 10 then passes through Goulds, where it has intersections with Route 3 and Route 11, before entering St. John's and coming to an end at an interchange with Route 2, with the road continuing north as The Parkway (Columbus Drive).

Major intersections

Attractions along Route 10

La Manche Provincial Park
Chance Cove Provincial Park
Cape Race Lighthouse
Cape Pine

See also

References

010
Streets in St. John's, Newfoundland and Labrador